An eclogue is a poem in a classical style on a pastoral subject.  Poems in the genre are sometimes also called bucolics.

Overview
The form of the word eclogue in contemporary English developed from Middle English , which came from Latin , which came from Greek  in the sense 'selection, literary product' (which was only one of the meanings it had in Greek). The term was applied metaphorically to short writings in any genre, including parts of a poetic sequence or poetry book. The combination of Virgil's influence and the persistence of pastoral poetry through the Renaissance imposed eclogues as the accepted term for the genre. Later Roman poets who wrote eclogues include Calpurnius and Nemesianus.

Variations on a theme
In 1526, the Italian Renaissance poet Jacopo Sannazaro published his Eclogae Piscatoriae (Fishermen's eclogues), replacing the traditional Virgilian shepherds with fishermen from the Bay of Naples. He was imitated shortly after by the English poet Phineas Fletcher in his Spenserian Piscatorie Eclogs (1633), while in the following century William Diaper published Nereides: or Sea-Eclogues in 1712, in which the speakers are sea-gods and sea-nymphs. 

By the early 18th century, the pastoral genre was ripe for renewal and an element of parody began to be introduced. John Gay ridiculed the eclogues of Ambrose Philips in the six 'pastorals' of The Shepherd's Week. The impulse to renewal and parody also met in the various "town eclogues" published at this time, transferring their focus from the fields to city preoccupations. The first was a joint publication by Jonathan Swift and his friends in The Tatler for 1710; John Gay wrote three more, as well as The Espousal, "a sober eclogue between two of the people called Quakers"; and Mary Wortley Montagu began writing a further six Town Eclogues from 1715.

In Scotland Allan Ramsay brought the novelty of Scots dialect to his two pastoral dialogues of 1723, "Patie and Roger" and "Jenny and Meggy", before expanding them into the pastoral drama of The Gentle Shepherd in the following year. Later the eclogue was further renewed by being set in exotic lands, first by the Persian Eclogues (1742) of William Collins, a revised version of which titled Oriental Eclogues was published in 1757. It was followed by the three African Eclogues (1770) of Thomas Chatterton, and by Scott of Amwell's three Oriental Eclogues (1782) with settings in Arabia, Bengal and Tang dynasty China. 

In 1811 the fortunes of the Peninsular War brought the subject back to Europe in the form of four Spanish Eclogues, including an elegy on the death of the Marquis de la Romana issued under the pseudonym Hispanicus. These were described in a contemporary review as "formed on the model of Collins". In the following decade they were followed by a vernacular "Irish Eclogue", Darby and Teague, a satirical account of a royal visit to Dublin ascribed to William Russell Macdonald (1787–1854).

Modern eclogues
The first English language eclogues were written by Alexander Barclay, in 1514. In English literature, Edmund Spenser's The Shepheardes Calendar (1579) also belongs to the genre (twelve eclogues, one for each month of the year). Alexander Pope produced a series of four eclogues (one for each season of the year) in imitation of Virgil in 1709. The Spanish poet Garcilaso de la Vega also wrote eclogues in the Virgilian style. In French, Pierre de Ronsard wrote a series of eclogues under the title Les Bucoliques, and Clément Marot also wrote in the genre. In the seventeenth century, collections of eclogues were published by the Polish poets Szymon Szymonowic and Józef Bartłomiej Zimorowic. W. H. Auden called his book-length The Age of Anxiety (1944–1946) a "Baroque Eclogue". Miklós Radnóti, the Hungarian Jewish poet, wrote eclogues about the Holocaust. Seamus Heaney's collection Electric Light (2001) includes "Bann Valley Eclogue", "Glanmore Eclogue", and an English version of Virgil's ninth eclogue. The most prolific modern poet writing eclogues was Louis MacNeice.

In music
The term has also been applied to pastoral music, with the first significant examples being piano works by the Czech composer Václav Tomášek. Jan Václav Voříšek, César Franck, Franz Liszt (in the first book of Années de Pèlerinage), Antonín Dvořák,  Jean Sibelius, Gerald Finzi, Vítězslav Novák, and Egon Wellesz are among other composers who used the title in their work. Claude Debussy based his "Prélude à l'après-midi d'un faune" on a famous eclogue by Stéphane Mallarmé. Mel Bonis titled the fourth movement of her 5 Pièces pour Piano (1897) "Églogue". Igor Stravinsky titled the second and third movements of his Duo Concertant (1932) "Eclogue I" and "Eclogue II". The middle movement of his three-movement Ode (1943) is also titled "Eclogue". A work that is believed to be an unfinished piano concerto by Gerald Finzi was posthumously titled "Eclogue" by the publisher.
Additionally, a composition with the title 'Eclogue' is a work by Maurice Blower for horn and strings, dating from the 1950s. CD label Cameo Classics recorded it in 2011, after the score had been discovered by the late composer's son, Thomas.  Another more recent application of the term is a 2006 composition for violin and piano using the Italian spelling 'Egloga' in a work by American composer Justin Rubin and recorded by Erin Aldridge (violin) in 2011.

References

Further reading

|

Genres of poetry
Ancient Greek poetry